Club de Fútbol Platges de Calvià, previously known as Club Deportivo Montuiri, is a football team based in Calvià, Balearic Islands. Founded in 1942, the team plays in Tercera División – Group 11, holding home games at the Poliesportiu Municipal de Magaluf with 3,500 seating capacity.

History
Founded in 1942 as CD Montuïri, the club spent 19 seasons in Tercera División before being absorbed by CF Platges de Calvià in June 2016. The original CF Platges de Calvià, who had been relegated, became the club's reserve team.

Season to season
As CD Montuïri

As CF Platges de Calvià

22 seasons in Tercera División

References

External links
 
Futbolme team profile 
CD Montuïri on FFIB.es 

Football clubs in the Balearic Islands
Sport in Mallorca
Association football clubs established in 1942
1942 establishments in Spain